Neotroglocarcinus is a genus of crabs belonging to the family Cryptochiridae.

Species:

Neotroglocarcinus balssi 
Neotroglocarcinus dawydoffi 
Neotroglocarcinus hongkongensis 
Neotroglocarcinus monodi

References

Crabs
Decapod genera